State Route 605 (SR 605) in Fauquier and Prince William Counties, Virginia, United States is a  secondary state highway from north of Warrenton near Bethel to southeast of Nokesville. From U.S. 15/U.S. 29 to its eastern terminus at VA 28, SR 605 serves as major artery serving traffic travelling between Warrenton and Nokesville, Manassas, and Dumfries. The entire route is two-lane and is located in rural or semi-rural areas, passing through farmland, woodland, and rural communities.

The segment of SR 605 west of U.S. 29 is known as Airlie Road, with a very short section of the route called Colonial Drive before intersection the U.S. highway. A signification portion of the route is named Dumfries Road, which runs east from U.S. 29 before it enters Prince William County as Fauquier Drive very briefly and terminates at VA 28.

Route description
SR 605 begins at State Route 628 (Blantyre Road) near Bethel in Fauquier County as Airlie Road and heads southeast towards the unincorporated community of Airlie then bends around the Airlie Airport. From there on the road continues southeast and briefly transitions to Colonial Drive and intersects the concurrent U.S. Routes 15 and 29 (Lee Highway) near Warrenton where the route becomes Dumfries Road, the longest segment of State Route 605. The road continues east into rural estate land before bending southeast again and passing through two signalized T-intersections with State Route 676 (Riley Road) and then State Route 602 (Rogues Road), both of which head northeast to Vint Hill Farms towards State Route 215 (Vint Hill Road). Continuing through Fauquier County, the route passes the Dumfries Market convenience store with a Citgo gas station, the sole retail area along the entire route, and continues curving around forests and farmland eastward. State Route 605 finally transitions into Fauquier Drive once entering Prince William County, short after intersects State Route 657 (Reid Lane), and then terminates at State Route 28 (Nokesville Road), south of the community of Nokesville.

Major intersections

Future
A roundabout is planned to be constructed at the crossroads Dumfries Road (SR 605) and Greenwich Road (SR 603), replacing a standard 4-way intersection controlled by stop signs on SR 603.

References

605 Fauquier and Prince William
State Route 605
State Route 605